Scottish Premiership Division Two is one of Scotland's national rugby union league divisions, and therefore part of the Scottish League Championship – being the middle division in the Scottish Premiership.
Until the 2009–10 season, the best teams were promoted to the Scottish Premiership Division One whereas the bottom teams were relegated to the Third Division. Since the 2010–11 season, the division merges with the Scottish Premiership Division One. After 11 matches, the top eight teams in Division One play each other in Premier A. The bottom four teams join the top four teams of Division Two to form Premier B and the bottom eight teams of Division Two form Premier C.

Division Two, 2011–12
Biggar RFC
Falkirk RFC
Hamilton RFC
Hillhead/Jordanhill RFC
Jed-Forest RFC
Kelso RFC
Peebles RFC
Selkirk RFC
Stewart's Melville FP
Watsonians RFC
West of Scotland RFC
Whitecraigs RFC
Details:

Past winners

Kelso
Langholm
Selkirk
Melrose
Kelso
Melrose

Selkirk
Kilmarnock RFC
Ayr
Glasgow Academicals
Kilmarnock RFC

Kilmarnock RFC
Jed-Forest
Stirling County

Watsonians
Kelso
West Of Scotland
Glasgow High Kelvinside
Kelso
Currie

Glasgow Hawks
Gala
Boroughmuir
Stirling County
Peebles
Watsonians
Gala
Stirling County
Dundee HSFP
Stirling County
West Of Scotland
Dundee HSFP
Stirling County
 ?
 ?
 ?
Glasgow Hawks
Boroughmuir
Selkirk

References

3